The W. C. Reebie and Brother Building is a building on Broadway in Chicago's Uptown community, and is a contributing property to the West Argyle Street Historic District.

History
The building was built in 1911 by William P. McEvoy & Co. It originally served as a furniture storage warehouse for the W. C. Reebie and Brother Company. In 1919, a rear addition was built, designed by George Kingsley. In 2010, the building was sold to real estate investor John Thomas, and in 2013 it was sold to Cedar Street Companies. In 2018, the building was purchased by TimeLine Theatre Company. In 2019, TimeLine Theatre received $1.5 million in funding from the State of Illinois to convert the building into a theater. In June 2021, TimeLine Theatre announced that they intend to demolish the building's historic facade and replace it with a glass and metal system.

References

1911 establishments in Illinois
Buildings and structures in Chicago
Commercial buildings completed in 1911
Historic district contributing properties in Illinois